Aubrey Otis Hampton (September 10, 1900 in Copeville, Texas – July 17, 1955 in Weare, New Hampshire) was an American radiologist remembered for describing Hampton's hump and Hampton's line. He graduated from Baylor College of Medicine in 1925, undertook his internship in Dallas and worked at the Massachusetts General Hospital from 1926. He became chief of radiology at Massachusetts General in 1941, serving as chief of radiology at the Walter Reed Army Hospital in Washington, D.C. from 1942 to 1945. Hampton was said to be one of the most accurate radiologists in diagnosing during his era.

Hampton died in 1955, aged 54, and is buried in the Hillside Cemetery, in Weare, New Hampshire.

Sources
Wonders of Radiology p. 62-65

External links 

American radiologists
1900 births
1955 deaths
People from Collin County, Texas
Baylor College of Medicine alumni
Physicians of Massachusetts General Hospital
20th-century American physicians